Myrcia pseudomarlierea is a species of plant in the family Myrtaceae. It is endemic to coastal rainforest habitats in southern Bahia, Brazil. The tree was first described in 2010, grows to between 4 and 20 metres tall, and produces red fruits between 12 and 15mm in diameter.

References

pseudomarlierea
Crops originating from the Americas
Crops originating from Brazil
Tropical fruit
Endemic flora of Brazil
Fruits originating in South America
Fruit trees
Berries
Plants described in 2010